The Men's Individual Time Trial at the 2001 UCI Road World Championships was the 8th edition of the event. The race took place on 11 October 2001 in Lisbon, Portugal. The race was won by Jan Ullrich of Germany.

Final classification

References

Men's Time Trial
UCI Road World Championships – Men's time trial